Requisition may refer to:
Purchase requisition, a document issued by a buyer to a seller indicating types, quantities, and agreed prices for products or services
Requisition in military logistics
Requisition of property by a government under eminent domain